Herman Samtseu Philip Mashaba (born August 26, 1959) is a South African politician, entrepreneur and the current president of ActionSA, a party he launched on 29 August 2020. He served as the Mayor of Johannesburg from 2016 to 2019. He is the founder of the hair product company Black Like Me. He is famous in South Africa for his background: he grew up struggling against poverty and the apartheid government to open his own hair business, which became the biggest hair brand in South Africa, making him a millionaire. He publicly backed Mmusi Maimane in the Democratic Alliance leadership race. He wrote the autobiography Black Like You and recently he wrote his new memoir "The accidental mayor". Mashaba is a libertarian and "capitalist crusader" whose highest value is "individual freedom."

On 22 August 2016, Mashaba was elected Mayor of Johannesburg by the first sitting of the city council following countrywide local government elections. He announced his resignation on 21 October 2019 and left office on 27 November 2019.

After launching his new party, Mashaba announced he would run for Mayor of Johannesburg again in the 2021 municipal elections, this time as the ActionSA candidate.

Early life and career

Mashaba was brought up in near-poverty in GaRamotse in Hammanskraal, north of Pretoria by his sisters while his mother worked to provide for the family.

His older brother dropped out of school at 15, moving from one unsubstantial job to another. Mashaba realised that acquiring an education would be crucial for him to break out of the cycle of poverty. He graduated from high school but did not complete his tertiary education.

As a young man, Mashaba bought a car without even having obtained his driver's license. He drove himself from one sales job to another. He started selling "SuperKurl" African hair-care products and became their number-one earner. He soon realised that these products excited him and that he wasn't content to be just an employee.

His company, Black Like Me, was launched on Valentine's Day in 1985 with a  loan from his friend, businessman Walter Dube.

Mashaba is also a music lover. After five years of secret lessons, he revealed himself as a pianist.

Politics 

From 2012 until May 2014, Mashaba served as chairman of the Free Market Foundation (FMF). He stepped down from his position when he joined the Democratic Alliance as an "ordinary card-carrying member", citing the need for the Foundation to remain politically impartial.

Mashaba announced in December 2015 that he would accept a nomination to stand as a Democratic Alliance mayoral candidate for the City of Johannesburg in the 2016 local government elections. The other possible DA candidate was Rabelani Dagada.

Mayor of Johannesburg 

In the municipal election on  3 August 2016, the ruling party, The African National Congress, lost their majority in Johannesburg, taking only 44.12% of the vote with the Democratic alliance taking 38.33%. The Democratic Alliance entered into conversations with the Economic Freedom Fighters to form a coalition. Whilst the EFF declined the offer, they agreed that they would vote for Mashaba as the Mayor of Johannesburg, despite misgivings.

On 22 August 2016, Mashaba was sworn in as a Johannesburg City Councillor. Later that day, he was sworn in as the Mayor of Johannesburg, the first non-ANC Johannesburg mayor since 1994. On 21 October 2019, he announced his resignation as mayor because of differences with DA party leadership. His resignation took effect on 27 November 2019.

Labour 

Mashaba has characterised the ANC's post-Apartheid labour laws as "draconian".

He led a Constitutional Court challenge by the FMF, arguing that Section 32 of the Labour Relations Act is unconstitutional. The FMF argued that the bargaining council process reduces competition, as smaller businesses may not be able to afford the higher wages agreed on between larger businesses and unions, contributing further to South Africa's unemployment rate.

Post-mayoral career

Mashaba formed The People's Dialogue, a medium to interact with ordinary South Africans and discuss social and civil issues, which launched on 6 December 2019, and closed on 29 February 2020.

After considering running for Mayor of Johannesburg under a different party banner, Mashaba launched the new political party, ActionSA, on 29 August 2020. After Russia invaded Ukraine in February 2022, Mashaba criticized the ruling ANC party for refusing to cut ties with Russia.

Public profile

Allegations of xenophobia 

Mashaba has made numerous public comments and actions that have been considered xenophobic and linked to incidence of xenophobic attacks and anti-immigrant sentiment. He has said South Africa has "nothing to apologise for" in reference to xenophobic violence occurring during his tenure as Johannesburg mayor  It is said that Mashaba leaves a xenophobic legacy although he has attended a sensitivity program on diversity by the Human Rights Commission.

Support for death penalty
Mashaba is in support of the reintroduction of the death penalty in South Africa but only for rape and murder.

References

External links

 Mashaba's bio on his autobiography's website
 Mashaba's page on Who's Who South Africa

1959 births
Living people
People from Hammanskraal
Democratic Alliance (South Africa) politicians
Mayors of Johannesburg
South African businesspeople
South African libertarians
University of Pretoria alumni
ActionSA politicians